Heroes is the eighth studio album by the Commodores, released in June 1980 by Motown Records.

Accolades
Heroes was nominated for a Grammy award in the category of Best R&B Performance by a Duo or Group with Vocals.

Songs
Record World said of the title track that "Lionel Ritchie sings with loving sincerity." Record World said of "Old-Fashion Love" that "Multi-octave vocal carousing and a funky percussion backdrop provide the setting on this plea for some premium love." Record World called the single "Jesus Is Love" an "inspirational ballad."

Track listing
"Got to Be Together" (Lionel Richie, Thomas McClary) – 5:44	
"Celebrate"  (Harold Hudson, Larry Davis, Thomas McClary) – 5:03	
"Old-Fashion Love" (Milan Williams) – 4:56	
"Heroes" (Darrell Jones, Lionel Richie) – 5:24	
"All The Way Down" (David Cochrane, Walter Orange) – 3:35	
"Sorry to Say" (Darrell Jones, Ronald LaPread) – 4:01	
"Wake Up Children" (Lionel Richie, Thomas McClary) – 4:33	
"Mighty Spirit" (Harold Hudson, William King) – 4:06	
"Jesus is Love" (Lionel Richie) – 6:04

Personnel 

Commodores
 Lionel Richie – vocals, saxophones, acoustic piano, keyboards
 Milan Williams – keyboards 
 Thomas McClary – vocals, guitars
 Ronald LaPread – bass
 Walter Orange – vocals, drums, percussion
 William King – trumpet

Additional personnel
 David Cochrane – keyboards, guitars, saxophones
 Harold Hudson – keyboards, trumpet 
 Darrell Jones – guitars 
 Ollie E. Brown – drums 
 Eddie "Bongo " Brown – percussion 
 James Anthony Carmichael – horn and string arrangements

Production 
 Commodores – producers, arrangements 
 James Anthony Carmichael – producer, arrangements 
 Calvin Harris – engineer, mixing 
 Jane Clark – engineer, mixing 
 Chris Bellman – mastering 
 Suzee Ikeda – production manager

Charts

Album

Singles

References

External links
 The Commodores-Heroes at Discogs

Heroes (Commodores album))
Commodores albums
Albums produced by James Anthony Carmichael
Albums produced by Lionel Richie
Motown albums